Darantasia caerulescens is a moth of the family Erebidae first described by Herbert Druce in 1898. It is found in New Guinea.

References

Nudariina
Moths described in 1898